Legacurry is a townland of 100 acres in County Down, Northern Ireland. It is situated in the civil parish of Drumbo and the historic barony of Castlereagh Upper.

The name may refer to a cauldron-like pool in the Ravernet River which forms the southern boundary of the townland.

Locally significant buildings include Legacurry Presbyterian Church, built in 1848.

See also
List of townlands in County Down

References

External links
Legacurry Presbyterian Church

Townlands of County Down
Civil parish of Drumbo